Yvonne Conte (6 February 1893 – 3 September 1959) was a French fencer. She competed in the individual women's foil competition at the 1924 Summer Olympics.

References

External links
 

1893 births
1959 deaths
French female foil fencers
Olympic fencers of France
Fencers at the 1924 Summer Olympics